Life and Times of Frederick Douglass is Frederick Douglass's third autobiography, published in 1881, revised in 1892. Because of the emancipation of American slaves during and following the American Civil War, Douglass gave more details about his life as a slave and his escape from slavery in this volume than he could in his two previous autobiographies (which would have put him and his family in danger). It is the only one of Douglass's autobiographies to discuss his life during and after the Civil War, including his encounters with American presidents such as Lincoln and Garfield, his account of the ill-fated "Freedman's Bank", and his service as the United States Marshall of the District of Columbia. Fredrick Douglass shed light on what life was like as an enslaved person. Although it is the least studied and analyzed, Life and Times of Frederick Douglass allows readers to view his life as a whole. 

The 1892 revision brought Douglass's story up to date with thirteen new chapters, the final three of which covered his experience in Haiti, to which he was U.S. minister from 1889 to 1891.  

The full title of both the 1881 and 1892 editions is Life and Times of Frederick Douglass, Written by Himself. His Early Life as a Slave, His Escape from Bondage, and His Complete History to the Present Time, Including His Connection with the Anti-slavery Movement; His Labors in Great Britain as Well as in His Own Country; His Experience in the Conduct of an Influential Newspaper; His Connection with the Underground Railroad; His Relations with John Brown and the Harper's Ferry Raid; His Recruiting the 54th and 55th Mass. Colored Regiments; His Interviews with Presidents Lincoln and Johnson; His Appointment by Gen. Grant to Accompany the Santo Domingo Commission—Also to a Seat in the Council of the District of Columbia; His Appointment as United States Marshal by President R.B. Hayes; Also His Appointment by President J.A. Garfield; with Many Other Interesting and Important Events of His Most Eventful Life; With an Introduction by Mr. George L. Ruffin, of Boston.

Hartford, Conn.: Park Publishing Co., 1881; Boston: De Wolfe & Fiske Co., 1892.

Part I

Chapters 1-4 
Douglass begins by describing his earliest childhood memories of living with his grandparents, Betsy and Isaac Bailey, until he was seven or eight years old. He was born enslaved in Talbot County on the Eastern Shore of Maryland. Douglass discusses how his grandmother was treated better than other Black people in the area. Douglass claims to know little about his parentage as his mother was rarely able to see him as a "hired out" enslaved person, and he is unsure of his father's identity. He recalls learning he was enslaved when forced to leave his grandparents' cabin to live and the Lloyd plantation. Douglass details the cruelty he witnessed and experienced while living at the Lloyd plantation.

Chapters 5-8 
Douglass details several cruel interactions he witnessed between Captain Anthony and enslaved people at the plantation. He is particularly descriptive of the Captain's interactions with enslaved women who had no control over what happened to them. Rape is described as a constant occurrence in an enslaved woman's life. In chapter seven, Douglass describes Colonel Loyds's life and house, which is contrasted with the horrors of slavery. He also describes the peculiar characteristics of overseers at the plantation, including Austin Gore - Mr. Hopkins's succeeder. Douglass also details how enslaved people were murdered by their overseers, such as Bill Denby, who Gore shot. The overseer received no punishment from his superiors.

Chapters 9-13 
Douglass befriends two white people from the Colonel's family - Lucretia (Captain Anthony's daughter and Captain Thomas Auld's wife) and Daniel Lloyd (Colonel Lloyd's youngest son). Lucretia informs Douglass that he will be sent to live with Mr. Hugh Auld. His move to Baltimore, Maryland, is described as a turning point in Douglass' life. Douglass highlights how Baltimore was brutal in slaveholding practices despite its proximity to a free state. Mrs. Auld and Douglass form a connection, and she gives him lessons on reading and writing. However, when Mr. Auld discovers his wife is teaching Douglass, he forbids her to do so. At this point, Douglass understands how knowledge is connected to freedom. Without Mrs. Auld's lessons, Douglass searches for different ways to educate himself, such as carrying a spell book and purchasing The Colombian Orator. With the acquisition of knowledge, Douglass begins an inner debate on the moralities of slavery. Charles Lawson, a Black man who resides near the Aulds, encourages Douglass to focus on Christianity. With Captain Anthony's death and all of his property, including enslaved people, was divided between his two children - Andrew and Lucretia. Douglass becomes Lucretia and Captain Thomas Auld's property after the division. Douglass is taken from Baltimore after Lucretia's death.

Chapters 14-17 
Captain Thomas Auld deprives his enslaved people of food and mistreats them. The Captain believes Douglass is spoiled and takes him to Edward Covey, a cruel man known to transform enslaved people obediently. Under Covey's control, Douglass is severely whipped, overworked, and abused. Douglass describes Covey as a hypocritical Christian. One day while working in the field, Douglass collapses as he has fallen ill from all the work, and Covey believes he is lying and therefore kicks him. Douglass walks back to St. Michaels and begs Captain Thomas Auld not to take him back to Covey, but the Captain denies the request. When Douglass returns, Covey is set on whipping him; however, Douglass resists and, at times, proves to be stronger than Covey. The overseers never beat Douglass again after the fight.

Chapters 18-21 
A year after staying with Covey, Douglass moves to William Freeland's farm, who is portrayed as less cruel than Covey. Douglass begins a Sunday school with other enslaved people that work with him. During his second year working at Freeland's farm, Douglass decided to escape and head North. Douglass confides in some of his fellow enslaved people who also plan to run away. However, they are betrayed and imprisoned. Captain Thomas Auld decides not to sell Douglass to the deep South and instead sends him to Baltimore, where he lives with Sophia Auld and Hugh. Douglass makes a deal with Auld, where he works elsewhere and is allowed to keep a small portion of his earnings while Auld receives the rest.

Nevertheless, Douglass attends a Methodist camp meeting without asking his masters' permission which causes Auld to be infuriated. Douglass works as a dutiful enslaved person while planning his escape. Finally, he succeeds in reaching New Bedford; however, he does not give details of how he does so to protect those who help him run away.

Part II

Chapter 1-5 
Douglass had not revealed the reasons for his escape in his first narrative because those details could harm others. He managed to escape by dressing as a sailor carrying a "sailor's protection" document that he borrowed from a friend. Being a sailor was a popular position for free Black people. Douglass boarded a train from Baltimore to Philadelphia, where he was able to use the document to board the train successfully. After successfully conquering obstacles, Douglass arrives in Philadelphia and boards another train heading to New York. After arriving in New York, Douglass realizes it is not safe there for fugitive enslaved people. With his connections and calking experience, Douglass is able to go to New Bedford, Massachusetts. Douglass finds a home in Massachusetts and changes his surname to Douglass. He delivered his first speech in 1841 on behalf of slavery abolition. The New England Anti-Slavery Society, which Douglass is a part of, organizes conventions in six of the free states. However, things do not run as expected. In Syracuse, New York, a man attempts to diverge the discussion of slavery abolition to communism. In Rochester, New York, and Clinton, Ohio, the Abolitionist cause is accepted positively, whereas, in Pendleton, Indiana, a mob attacked Douglass and other abolitionists, leaving them injured.

Chapter 6-8 
After the publication of his narrative in 1845, Douglass went to England, where he did not experience prejudice at all. Douglass is able to raise enough money to purchase his freedom from Captain Thomas Auld. After returning from Europe, Douglass settled in Rochester and published The North Star, an anti-slavery newspaper. In the newspaper, Douglass discusses the American Constitution and how it is a pro-liberty document. Douglass still experiences prejudice when living in Rochester and draws attention to the everlasting oppressive system. While working as a conductor on the Underground Railroad, Douglass assisted fugitive enslaved people trying to go to Canada. Douglass met different people, such as John Brown and Harriet Beecher Stowe, who influenced his life as an abolitionist.

Chapters 9-12 
Douglass discusses how the tension between the North and the South increased as anti-slavery movements were impacting slaveholding. John Brown and his companions grasped control of the federal arsenal at Harpers Ferry, Virginia, as part of a grander scheme to liberate enslaved people. People assumed Douglass was involved due to his connection to Brown and thus became a fugitive wanted by the federal government and the state of Virginia. Although Douglass knew about Brown's plan, he was not on board with the idea because he thought it was doomed to fail. Douglass escaped to Canada and then flew to England after he became a wanted fugitive. While in Europe, Douglass finds out that Anne, his daughter, has passed away, and he decides to return to America regardless of the consequences. With the election of President Abraham Lincoln, Douglass views the American Civil War as a fight to end the slavery system. Douglass met Lincoln, who welcomed him into the White House and listened to his concerns regarding the unequal treatment of Black people. President Lincoln's Emancipation Proclamation, issued on January 1, 1863, freed enslaved people in the area of rebel governments.

Chapters 13-19 
After the abolition of slavery, Douglass realized the emancipated enslaved people needed advocates to speak on their behalf. Douglass continues delivering speeches that seek to achieve equality. He is elected by the citizens of Rochester to represent them at the National Loyalist Convention. Douglass meets Amanda Sears, Lucretia Auld's daughter when walking in the procession. Douglass established the New National Era after he moved to Washington, DC. Douglass also became a member of the Board of Trustees of the Freedmen's Savings and Trust Company. He was then elected the bank's president. Douglass visits Captain Thomas Auld in 1877 when he returns to St. Michaels. His former master tells Douglass that he was "too smart" to be enslaved and was correct to escape. He also visits the Lloyd plantation, which brings memories from his past as an enslaved person. Douglass discusses how he experienced prejudice even as a free man. For example, when trying to eat dinner while traveling in a steamer, white people remove him from the cabin due to his skin color. In the final chapter of his Part II, Douglass thanks people he knows who participated in the anti-slave movement as well as a reflection of a person's purpose in life. Douglass concludes Part II by acknowledging that his purpose in recounting his story has been fulfilled.

Part III

Chapters 1-7 
Part III of the narrative was written ten years after Douglass wrote and published Parts I and II. In chapter one, Douglass reflects on the abolitionist days, while the remaining chapters discuss the events of 1881-1891. Douglass discusses President James Garfield's inauguration and later on his death about a month after he was shot by Charles J. Guiteau. Douglass served as United States Marshal of the District of Columbia when James Garfield became president, and his death impacted Douglass and his hopes for equality. Prior to his death, President Garfield had informed Douglass of his plan to appoint a Black man as US minister. Douglass becomes the Recorder of Deeds for the District of Columbia, which he enjoys more than his previous position. Douglass was judged for remarrying a woman named Helen Pitts two years after his wife died.

Douglass expresses his admiration for President Grover Cleveland as he "acts upon his convictions." He argues that the results of the 1884 presidency were due to the fact that Republicans disregarded Black people as means to increase Southern support.

Chapter 8-13 
Douglass reflects on his trip to Europe and the rest of the world with his wife in 1886 and the people he met in Great Britain years before. He details the scenery and people he met along the way. He continues to deliver speeches all over the world, speaking on behalf of Black people aiming to achieve racial equality. Specifically, Douglass speaks against the Supreme Court's decision to invalidate the 1875 Civil Rights Act. Douglass in then appointed Minister Resident and Consul General to the Republic of Haiti by President Harrison in 1889. However, after some time, Douglass resigned from this position due to increased public pressure from the American Press. The last two chapters of Part III address his conduct as Minister of Haiti. Although Douglass concludes his book with a hopeful tone, there is no happy ending.

Key Figures 

 Frederick Douglass: writer, abolitionist, social activist, public speaker, and former enslaved person.
 Sophia Auld: Hugh Auld's wife, who at first treats Douglass with much kindness and gives him lessons on how to read and write. However, at a request from her husband, Auld ceases to teach Douglass and tries to prevent him from acquiring knowledge.
 Betsy Bailey: Frederick Douglass' grandmother who Douglass lived in her cabin until he turned seven years old.
 Captain Aaron Anthony: Douglass's first legal owner. Captain Anthony is described as a cruel enslaver and an unhappy man.
 Lucretia Auld: Captain Aaron Anthony's daughter who is very kind towards Douglass. Lucretia used to bring bread to Douglass on nights he felt hungry.
 Captain Thomas Auld: Lucretia Auld's husband who takes possession of Douglass once his wife dies. Captain Thomas Auld sends Douglass to work on Edward Covey's farm, where he is severely abused.
 Austin Gore: An overseer of the Lloyd plantation who is described to be extremely cruel. Gore murders Bill Denby, one of the enslaved people on the Lloyd plantation.
 Edward Covey: Known as the "negro-breaker," Covey abuses enslaved people working on his farm as a means to make them more obedient. After enduring much abuse from Covey, Frederick engages in a fight with him which puts an end to Covey's physical mistreatment of Douglass.
 Charles Lawson: A Black man who introduces the powerfulness of Christianity to Douglass.
 John Brown: A man who influenced Douglass' life as an abolitionist. Brown and his companions architected a raid by grasping control of the federal arsenal at Harpers Ferry, Virginia, as part of a grander scheme to liberate enslaved people.

Reactions to Text 
Several scholars criticized the Life and Times of Frederick Douglass, and Douglass was disappointed with how his narrative was received. From the 1880s to 1890s, African American newspapers entirely ignored his third narrative. William Andrews, as well as other scholars’, criticized the fact that Douglass’ last autobiography can be seen as a shift of African American literature from “asserting black identity against a slaveholding nation” to “accommodation to the values and goals of the white middle class into which they attempted to assimilate”. For said scholars, Douglass’ last autobiography lacks a sense of purpose in the post-Civil War era. Other scholars argue that in Life and Times of Frederick Douglass, Douglass tries to escape the "tautology of language". While in his two previous narratives, Douglass was focused on the quest for literacy, in Life and Times, he sought to "re(connect) with a realm outside of language". Grandt argues that Douglass finds it difficult "to escape the tautology of language by placing authentic blackness outside of the text itself". The shift in focus on Douglass' third autobiography caused it to be the least studied out of all three of his autobiographies. Other scholars believe that the Life and Times of Frederick Douglass suffer the loss of "emotional force and economy".

See also 
 Narrative of the Life of Frederick Douglass, an American Slave. First autobiography, 1845.
 My Bondage and My Freedom: Second autobiography, 1855.

References

External links

 The Life and Times of Frederick Douglass: From 1817-1882
 The Life and Times of Frederick Douglass: 1817-1892
 The Frederick Douglass Papers Project 
 

1881 non-fiction books
1892 non-fiction books
Works by Frederick Douglass
African-American autobiographies
American Civil War memoirs
Books about African-American history
Slave narratives